DeGalan Peak is a peak that rises to  at the head of Magnis Valley in the Britannia Range. It was named after Lee DeGalan, a contractor employee in charge of United States Antarctic Program cargo shipments out of Port Hueneme, CA, for more than 20 years.

References

Mountains of Oates Land